Twenty Thousand Streets Under the Sky is a 2005 BBC television serial depicting the intersecting lives of three working-class Londoners in the 1920s. The series is based on the trilogy '’20,000 Streets Under the Sky'’ by British author Patrick Hamilton. It stars Sally Hawkins, Zoë Tapper and Bryan Dick. The three-part drama was shown on BBC Four, accompanied by the documentary Words, Whisky and Women, and was also released on DVD, HD DVD and Blu-ray. The series was released in the United States on BBC America on 11 February 2006.

Cast
Bryan Dick – Bob
Sally Hawkins – Ella
Zoë Tapper – Jenny Maple
Phil Davis – Ernest Eccles
Susan Wooldridge – Ella's Mother
Elisabeth Dermot Walsh – Mrs Sanderson-Chantry
Kellie Shirley – Violet
Tony Haygarth – The Governor (pub landlord)
Jacqueline Tong – The Governor's Wife

Episodes

Reception
The Los Angeles Times called the series "a dreamy but gritty period drama, superbly acted" and "the kind of television at which the BBC repeatedly excels – rich and fulfilling for its understatement, discreet tales that are well told."

Variety praised the series, writing that it "brims with a sense of yearning that takes the very old quandary of not being able to control who one loves and puts an evergreen spin on it. Moreover, the production itself is as meticulous as the storytelling, from the drab palette used in capturing the Depression-era surroundings to the melancholy score."

References

External links
 
 

2005 British television series debuts
2005 British television series endings
2000s British drama television series
BBC television dramas
2000s British television miniseries
English-language television shows
Television series set in the 1930s
Television shows set in London